The 1995–96 Alabama–Huntsville Chargers ice hockey team represented the University of Alabama in Huntsville in the 1995–96 NCAA Division II men's hockey season, winning the national championship.  It was the school's first NCAA national championship, following club national championships in 1981–82, 1982–83, and 1983–84.  The team was coached by Doug Ross, who was in his 14th season as head coach, and played their home games at the Von Braun Civic Center.

The Chargers completed the regular season with 22 wins, zero losses, and 3 ties. They were then invited to play the Bemidji State Beavers in a two-game series to determine the Division II National Championship at Huntsville's Von Braun Civic Center. The Chargers would dominate in both a 7–1 victory on March 8, followed by 3–0 shutout to clinch the championship the following day.

In the weeks following the championship, speculation on plans for a new 4,000-seat arena near the Benton H. Wilcoxon Municipal Iceplex for the Chargers were later abandoned. Additionally, whether or not to move back to Division I became an issue, but UAH would refrain from the jump until 1998.

Roster

|}

Regular season

Schedule
 Green background indicates win.
 Red background indicates loss.
 Yellow background indicates tie.

|-
!colspan=12 style=""| Regular Season

|-
!colspan=12 style=""| NCAA Division II Championship Series

Player stats

Skaters

Goaltenders

References

Alabama–Huntsville Chargers men's ice hockey seasons
NCAA men's ice hockey championship seasons
Alabama Huntsville